Lieutenant General George Lewis CB (2 May 1774 – 14 September 1854) was a career officer in the Royal Marines, active during the Napoleonic Wars and the War of 1812. He rose to the rank of lieutenant general and served as Colonel Commandant of the Royal Marines, Portsmouth Division.

Lewis was born in Stoke Damerel, Devon on 2 May 1774. He was the officer commanding the ship's complement of Marines on board  during the Battle of Cape Ortegal in November 1805; the concluding action of the Trafalgar Campaign.

In July 1808, he disembarked at Figueira da Foz in the mouth of the Mondego River in command of a Marine detachment from the squadron, of upwards of 300 marines, in order to counter the French and to support the Portuguese.

He was present with several companies of Marines in the Netherlands from November 1813 to February 1814. This force was to become the third raiding Battalion; a precursor to the Marine Commandos of the 20th century. As the officer commanding this battalion, he prepared the battalion for deployment to North America, and accompanied them.

During the War of 1812, he participated in the Chesapeake campaign, and was present at the battles of Bladensburg and Baltimore, and the attack on Washington. Illness necessitated his departure from that theatre of war in November 1814.

Lewis became a brevet major and was appointed a Companion of the Order of the Bath, following his return to England in 1815. Further promotions followed, he became lieutenant colonel and 2nd Commandant and was promoted to Colonel Commandant of the Portsmouth Division on 10 July 1837, vice Colonel Commandant Harry Percival Lewis, retired. Hart's 1850 Annual Army List shows George Lewis as a major general on the Army list, having retired from the Royal Marines as a Colonel Commandant with full pay status.

He died in Stonehouse, Plymouth on 14 September 1854. The December 1854 edition of The Gentleman's Magazine carried a brief obituary.

Military promotions and distinctions 
Second lieutenant – H.M. Marine Forces, appointed on 23 April 1793
First lieutenant – H.M. Marine Forces, 6 October 1794
Captain – H.M. Marine Forces, 1 October 1801
Brevet major – (Army List), 6 June 1813
Companion of the Order of the Bath, 2 January 1815
Lieutenant colonel – Royal Marines, 28 September 1826
"Lieutenant Colonel and Second Commandant" – Royal Marines,      16 April 1832
Colonel commandant – Royal Marines, 10 July 1837 
Major general – (Army List), 9 November 1846
Lieutenant general – (Army List), 20 June 1854

See also 
Corps of Colonial Marines

Notes

References 

Royal Marines generals
Companions of the Order of the Bath
Royal Navy personnel of the French Revolutionary Wars
Royal Navy personnel of the Napoleonic Wars
British military personnel of the War of 1812
1774 births
1854 deaths
Military personnel from Plymouth, Devon